All Aboard: A Tribute to Johnny Cash is a tribute album to country musician Johnny Cash featuring songs from well-known punk and folk rock artists, such as the Bouncing Souls and Chuck Ragan. It was released on Anchorless Records on October 21, 2008. The profits from this album goes to Syrentha Savio Endowment, which provides financial support to underprivileged breast cancer patients.

References

Country albums by American artists
Johnny Cash tribute albums
2008 compilation albums